Estación de Aravaca is a station on Line 2 of the Metro Ligero. It is located in fare Zone A.

References 

Madrid Metro Ligero stations
Moncloa-Aravaca
Railway stations in Spain opened in 2007